Mason Brodine (born February 18, 1988) is a former American football tight end. He signed with the Oakland Raiders as an undrafted free agent on July 26, 2011. He played college football for Nebraska–Kearney.

Early years
Brodine attended Elm Creek High school in Nebraska.  Brodine helped his high school team win their first playoff game in 2004.

College career
Brodine played college football at the University of Nebraska–Kearney. Brodine was a 2nd-team All-Central Region and 1st-team All-RMAC selection.

Professional career

Oakland Raiders
On July 26, 2011, Brodine signed with the Oakland Raiders as an Undrafted free agent. On September 3, 2011, he was released. On September 5, 2011, he was signed to the practice squad. On December 17, 2011 he was promoted to the active roster. On December 18, 2011, he made his NFL debut against the Detroit Lions. On August 27, 2012, he was released after appearing in two games in 2011.

St. Louis Rams
On August 28, 2012, Brodine was claimed off waivers. On August 31, 2012, Brodine was released on the day of roster cuts. On September 2, 2012, Brodine was signed to the practice squad. In 2014, Brodine attempted to make the transition from defensive end to tight end, but injured his ankle and was declared out for the entire season.

New England Patriots
On August 6, 2014, Brodine signed with the New England Patriots. The team released him four days later.

References

External links
 Nebraska-Kearney bio
 Oakland Raiders bio
 St. Louis Rams bio

1988 births
Living people
American football defensive ends
Nebraska–Kearney Lopers football players
Oakland Raiders players
St. Louis Rams players
New England Patriots players